The women's 100 metre backstroke event at the 2004 Olympic Games was contested at the Olympic Aquatic Centre of the Athens Olympic Sports Complex in Athens, Greece on August 15 and 16.

U.S. swimmer Natalie Coughlin won the gold medal in this event, outside the record time of 1:00.37. The silver medal was awarded to Zimbabwe's Kirsty Coventry, who finished behind Coughlin by 0.13 of a second, breaking an African record of 1:00.50. France's Laure Manaudou, who won the gold in the 400 m freestyle on the previous day, took home the bronze medal, with a time of 1:00.88. In the semifinals, Coughlin lowered an Olympic record time of 1:00.21, set by Romania's Diana Mocanu in Sydney (2000), to 1:00.17.

Records
Prior to this competition, the existing world and Olympic records were as follows.

The following new world and Olympic records were set during this competition.

Results

Heats

Semifinals

Semifinal 1

Semifinal 2

Final

References

External links
Official Olympic Report

W
2004 in women's swimming
Women's events at the 2004 Summer Olympics